The men's 100 metres at the 1938 European Athletics Championships was held in Paris, France, at Stade Olympique de Colombes on 3  September 1938.

Medalists

Results

Final
3 September

Semi-finals
3 September

Semi-final 1

Semi-final 2

Heats
3 September

Heat 1

Heat 2

Heat 3

Heat 4

Participation
According to an unofficial count, 20 athletes from 13 countries participated in the event.

 (2)
 (2)
 (1)
 (2)
 (1)
 (1)
 (1)
 (2)
 (1)
 (1)
 (2)
 (2)
 (2)

References

100
100 metres at the European Athletics Championships